Marilyna darwinii, known as the Darwin toadfish, is a species of pufferfish in the family Tetraodontidae. It is native to the Western Pacific, where it is known from Papua New Guinea and reported from Australia. It inhabits tropical marine and brackish waters and reaches 9.5 cm (3.7 inches) SL.

References 

Tetraodontidae
Fish described in 1873